Kamal bani hani is a gastrointestinal surgeon and the former president of Hashemite University, and previous dean of faculty of medicine at Hashemite University. He also was the dean of faculty of medicine at Jordan University of Science and Technology from September 2008 to October 2010.

Qualifications 
He graduated from College of Medicine University of Baghdad in Iraq in 1984. At 1992 he graduated from Royal College of Physicians & Surgeons of Glasgow in the United Kingdom and in 2002 he awarded the doctoral degree from Leeds University.

Awards
 Scopus from Elsevier award to honor his contribution to science in April 2009.
 Marquis Who's Who at 2009 in medicine and healthcare.
 2018 Golisano Health Leadership Award.

References

External links

 Published research of Kamal Bani Hani. 
 Personal page on NCBI 
 MOU between Wikimedia foundation and the Hashemite University

Fellows of the Royal College of Surgeons
Academic staff of Hashemite University
1958 births
Living people
Jordanian surgeons
University of Baghdad alumni
Alumni of the University of Leeds